Shinobu Tanno (丹野忍 Tanno Shinobu, born 1973) is a Japanese illustrator, born in Ibaraki Prefecture, Japan.
Tanno graduated in 1997 from Ritsumeikan University. Self-taught, Tanno has illustrated in a number of fields, from CD cover design to video game and novel illustration.

Illustration Works 
Tanno has contributed to the Guin Saga novel series, written by Kaoru Kurimoto, The Heroic Legend of Arslan novel series, written by Yoshiki Tanaka, the Vandal Hearts video game, and the cover to the single "Mirror" by famous Japanese musician Gackt.

References

External links 
 Entry at Japanese-language Wikipedia (Japanese)

1973 births
Japanese illustrators
Living people
People from Ibaraki Prefecture
Ritsumeikan University alumni